Cabbagetown is a neighbourhood in central Toronto, Ontario, Canada. Administratively, it is defined as part of the Cabbagetown-South St. Jamestown neighbourhood. It largely features semi-detached Victorian houses and is recognized as "the largest continuous area of preserved Victorian housing in all of North America", according to the Cabbagetown Preservation Association.

Cabbagetown's name derives from the  Irish immigrants who moved to the neighbourhood beginning in the late 1840s, said to have been so poor that they grew cabbage in their front yards. Canadian writer Hugh Garner's novel, Cabbagetown, depicted life in the neighbourhood during the Great Depression.

History
The area today known as Cabbagetown was first known as the village of Don Vale, just outside Toronto. Before the 1850s it consisted of farmland dotted with cottages and vegetable plots. It grew up in the 1840s around the Winchester Street Bridge, which before the construction of the Prince Edward Viaduct was the main northern bridge over the Don River.  This was near the site where Castle Frank Brook flowed in the Don River. By the bridge the Don Vale Tavern and Fox's Inn were established to cater to travellers. In 1850 the Toronto Necropolis was established in the area as the city's main cemetery.

In the late 19th century the area was absorbed into the city. It became home to the working class Irish inhabitants who were employed in the industries along the lake shore to the south in Corktown. Brick Victorian-style houses were built throughout the area. The name Cabbagetown purportedly came from stories of new Macedonian and Irish immigrants digging up their front lawns and planting cabbage. In this era the Cabbagetown name most often applied to the area south of Gerrard Street, with the part to the north still being called Don Vale. It was a working-class neighbourhood, with approximately 50% of the residents renting houses. It reached its peak of prosperity just before the First World War, which is from when many of the brick homes in the area date. The various architectural styles visible in the neighborhood range from Second-Empire to Bay-n-Gable and High Victorian Terraces, with excellent examples being Francis Shields' House at 377 Sackville St.

After the war the area became increasingly impoverished. A large number of poorer residents moved in, many resorting to share one house among multiple families. The nineteenth-century brick houses began deteriorating and, as landlords saw less value in the neighbourhood, they were not maintained. It became known as one of Toronto's largest slums and much of the original Cabbagetown was razed in the late 1940s to make room for the Regent Park housing project. A new immigrant influx also lead to the beginning of ethnic diversity in the neighbourhood. The remaining section to the north, then still known as Don Vale, was also slated to be cleared and replaced by housing projects. In 1964 a Toronto Star writer wrote that "Cabbagetown has become a downhill ride and if you're on way up, you don't dare stay there for long unless you live in Regent Park."

The construction of new housing projects was halted in the 1970s. In Don Mount this effort was led by Karl Jaffary, who was elected to city council in the 1969 municipal election along with a group of like-minded councillors who opposed sweeping urban renewal plans. John Sewell led the effort to preserve Trefann Court, which covered the southern section of the original Cabbagetown. A bylaw was approved in the 1970s to ban any building higher than four storeys, in reaction to the high density high-rises being built in neighbouring St. James Town.

Gentrification

Cabbagetown was gentrified by affluent professionals, beginning in the 1970s. Many residents restored small Victorian row houses and became community activists. Darrell Kent, a resident and local businessman, is recognized by the community as having been the driving force behind the restoration of many of the area’s beautiful and unique Victorian houses. As Kent was a gay real estate agent, gay men and some lesbians made up the earliest gentrifying groups of Cabbagetown. They are still a significant part of the population today, and the area is considered queer friendly.

In 1983 the Globe and Mail wrote, Cabbagetown is probably the epitome of successful labelling. The core of the area—generally defined as being bounded by Parliament, Wellesley and Dundas Streets and the Don Valley—was once Toronto's skid row. Today, about a decade after the area was invaded by young professionals, speculators and real estate agents, there are still a few derelicts around to give the area colour. The houses, meanwhile, sell for upward of $200,000.35 years after that article was written, most homes in the area sell for well over $1 million.
Vestiges of a 1960s, counter-culture ambiance remain at vintage clothing stores, health food stores and a gestalt therapy clinic. A Victorian farm, once the site of a zoo, is located adjacent to Riverdale Park West, where a weekly farmer's market is held. A short distance away is the Cabbagetown Youth Centre, home of the Cabbagetown Boxing Club, a reminder of an earlier, and rougher, past. In recent years, some businesses from the nearby "gay village" of Church and Wellesley, have relocated to the area, attracted by cheaper commercial rents.

Despite gentrification, residents from public housing projects and affluent home owners mingle at a discount supermarket and a community medical clinic. Panhandling and drug-dealing are part of the urban landscape; so are gourmet shops, upscale boutiques and arts festivals, book launches and wine-tastings at local restaurants. Paradoxically, The Gerrard and Parliament neighbourhood, located near Dundas and Sherbourne Streets, has the largest concentration of homeless shelters and drop-in centres in Canada. The area is also distinguished by a large number of rooming houses and other forms of low-income housing.

Residents and notable people
The neighbourhood is home to many artists, musicians, journalists and writers. Other residents include professors, doctors and social workers, many affiliated with the nearby University of Toronto and the many hospitals on University Avenue. Proximity to the financial district and downtown core have also made the area popular with other professionals such as lawyers, management consultants and those in financial services.

Celebrities who have at some time been residents of Cabbagetown include:
Brent Butt—comedian
Tarek Fatah—Journalist
Larry Gains—boxer
Avril Lavigne—Canadian singer, songwriter and actress
Amy Millan—indie folk/rock singer and guitarist
Robbie Robertson—musician, songwriter, film composer, producer, actor, and author
Tonetta—singer-songwriter and visual artist 
Kenny Hotz & Spencer Rice - Filmed multiple seasons of Kenny vs Spenny in a house located in Cabbagetown.
Noah Richler - Author/Political Candidate and Commentator. (Cabbagetown Toronto, ON, and Sandy Cove N.S.)

As part of a project called "Cabbagetown People," historical plaques have been placed on noteworthy homes. A map of the locations has been erected in Riverdale Park West, and an index of the addresses, with the names of the former residents, is posted on a website devoted to this project. The people listed include:

Hugh Garner
Ernest MacMillan
Betty Oliphant
Al Purdy
Gordon Sinclair
Ernest Thompson Seton—lived at 6 Aberdeen Avenue
Thomas P. Kelley, author of The Black Donnellys—lived at 564 Parliament St.

See also
List of annual events in Toronto
List of neighbourhoods in Toronto
List of parks in Toronto

References

Further reading 
Cabbagetown Store, J.V. McAree (short stories): Ryerson Press (1953) (113 pages)
Working People: Life in a downtown city neighbourhood, James Lorimer & Myfanwy Phillips: James Lewis & Samuel Ltd (1971) (hardcover)  (274 pages): James Lewis & Samuel Ltd (1971) (paperback)  (274 pages)
Cabbagetown, Hugh Garner (novel): McGraw-Hill Ryerson/Trade (1978)  (415 pages): McGraw-Hill Ryerson/Trade (2002)  (424 pages)
Cabbagetown: The story of a Victorian neighbourhood, Penina Coopersmith: James Lorimer & Co (1998)  (96 pages)
Cabbagetown Remembered, George H. Rust-D'Eye: The Boston Mills Press (1984) 
Cabbagetown in Pictures, Colleen Kelly: Toronto Public Library (1984) 
Touring Old Cabbagetown: Cabbagetown Preservation Association (1992) 
The Banker of Cabbagetown, Eric S. Rosen: s.n. (1991) 
Images of Cabbagetown Photography by James Wiley: V.A. Gates (1994)  (128 pages)
The Knot, Tim Wynne-Jones (novel): McClelland and Stewart Limited (1982) 
The Intruders : A Novel, Hugh Garner: McGraw-Hill Ryerson (1976) 
Cabbagetown Diary : A Documentary, (novel) Juan Butler: Peter Martin Associates, Ltd. (1970)

External links

Cabbagetown/Regent Park Community Museum

Cabbagetown
Historic districts in Canada